Abu ol Khazen (also Romanized as Abū ol Khāzen and Abū Al Khāzen; also known as Abolkhāzen, Shaikh Abul Khāzen, and Sheykh Abū ol Khāzen) is a village in Jazin Rural District, in the Central District of Bajestan County, Razavi Khorasan Province, Iran. At the 2006 census, its population was 227, in 59 families.

See also 

 List of cities, towns and villages in Razavi Khorasan Province

References 

Populated places in Bajestan County